Alek Isaac Manoah (born January 9, 1998) is an American professional baseball pitcher for the Toronto Blue Jays of Major League Baseball (MLB). He was selected by the Blue Jays with the 11th overall pick of the 2019 Major League Baseball draft out of West Virginia University, and made his MLB debut on May 27, 2021.

Amateur career
Manoah attended South Dade High School in Homestead, Florida. As a junior, he hit .492 with five home runs and 32 RBIs. That summer, he played in the Under Armour All-America Baseball Game at Wrigley Field. During his senior year, he signed to play college baseball at West Virginia University. Manoah was not drafted in the 2016 Major League Baseball draft out of high school and thus enrolled at West Virginia.

In 2017, as a freshman at West Virginia, Manoah appeared in 19 games (ten starts), pitching to a 1–1 record with a 3.07 ERA, earning a spot on the Big 12 All-Freshman Team. As a sophomore in 2018, Manoah went 3–5 with a 4.00 ERA in 23 games (eight starts). He particularly struggled with command, posting a 1.50 WHIP. That summer, he pitched in the Cape Cod Baseball League for the Chatham Anglers where he went 4–3 with a 3.57 ERA in nine starts. Prior to the 2019 season, Manoah was named a preseason All-American by Baseball America. During the season, Manoah was named to the Golden Spikes Award watchlist along with unanimously being named the Big 12 Pitcher of the Year. At the time he received the award, he was 8–3 with a 1.91 ERA in 14 starts, striking out 125 batters in 94 innings. He finished his junior year with a 9–4 record and a 2.08 ERA over 16 starts, compiling 144 strikeouts over  innings.

Professional career

Minor leagues
Manoah was considered one of the top prospects for the 2019 Major League Baseball draft. He was selected by the Toronto Blue Jays with the 11th overall pick. He signed for $4.55 million and made his professional debut with the Vancouver Canadians of the Class A-Short Season Northwest League on July 27. Over six starts, Manoah compiled a 2.65 ERA with 27 strikeouts over 17 innings. Manoah did not play a minor league game in 2020 due to the cancellation of the minor league season caused by the COVID-19 pandemic.

To begin the 2021 season, Manoah was assigned to the Buffalo Bisons of the Triple-A East. In his first start of the season, he struck out 12 batters over six scoreless innings. Over three starts with Buffalo, Manoah went 3–0 with a 0.50 ERA and 27 strikeouts over 18 innings.

Major leagues
On May 27, 2021, Manoah was selected to the 40-man roster and promoted to the major leagues for the first time, and started against the New York Yankees that day, while picking up the win in a 2–0 final. He recorded his first MLB strikeout in his debut against Yankees infielder Rougned Odor. Overall, Manoah totalled seven strikeouts while allowing two walks, no runs, and two hits over six innings. On June 22, he was suspended five games for an incident stemming from a June 19 game in which he was ejected for intentionally hitting Baltimore Orioles third baseman Maikel Franco with a pitch. On July 2, Manoah recorded seven consecutive strikeouts against the Tampa Bay Rays at Sahlen Field, setting a Blue Jays franchise record. Manoah finished his rookie season with the Blue Jays having started twenty games in which he went 9–2 with a 3.22 ERA and 127 strikeouts over  innings.

Manoah was selected to represent the Blue Jays alongside teammates Santiago Espinal, George Springer, Alejandro Kirk, and Vladimir Guerrero Jr. in the 2022 Major League Baseball All-Star Game. Manoah pitched one scoreless inning and struck out all three batters he faced. In 2022, Manoah went 16–7 with a 2.24 ERA in 196 innings while striking out 180 batters. He started the first game of the Wild Card Series against the Seattle Mariners, pitching 5 innings giving up four hits and four earned runs with four strikeouts as the Blue Jays were swept by the Mariners in the series. Manoah also finished third in Cy Young Award voting, behind Dylan Cease of the Chicago White Sox and winner Justin Verlander of the Houston Astros.

Pitching style
Manoah features an upper 90s mph fourseam fastball, a mid 90s sinker, a changeup, and a slider that he learned from watching Dellin Betances on Rob Friedman's Twitter account.

Personal life
Manoah's older brother, Erik, was drafted by the New York Mets in the 13th round of the 2014 Major League Baseball draft, but was released in 2019. Manoah is of Cuban descent and can speak Spanish.

References

Further reading

External links

1998 births
Living people
American expatriate baseball players in Canada
American League All-Stars
American people of Cuban descent
Baseball players from Miami
Buffalo Bisons (minor league) players
Chatham Anglers players
Major League Baseball pitchers
People from Homestead, Florida
South Dade Senior High School alumni
Toronto Blue Jays players
Vancouver Canadians players
West Virginia Mountaineers baseball players